Local elections were held in Northern Ireland on Thursday 22 May 2014, contesting 462 seats in all, as part of the wider local elections across the United Kingdom. The election took place on the same day as the European Parliament election. 1,243,649 people aged 18 and over were eligible to vote, and 51.3% of the electorate turned out.

Voter eligibility
All voters were required to present one piece of photographic ID in order to cast a vote at the polling station. Accepted forms of ID were an electoral identity card, an EEA photographic driving licence, a European Union member-state passport, a Translink 60+ SmartPass, a Translink Senior SmartPass, a Translink Blind Person's SmartPass or a Translink War Disabled SmartPass. Voters lacking an accepted type of photographic ID had until 9 May 2014 to apply for an electoral identity card from the Electoral Office.

Background
The elections represented a milestone in the reform of local government in Northern Ireland, as councillors were elected to 11 new councils. These operated in shadow form until Wednesday 1 April 2015, with the current 26 councils existing in parallel until then.

The 11 new councils, with links to the official lists of candidates standing ("statements of persons nominated"), are:
Belfast City Council (Candidates)
North Down and Ards District Council (Candidates)
Antrim and Newtownabbey District Council (Candidates)
Lisburn and Castlereagh District Council (Candidates)
Newry, Mourne and Down District Council (Candidates)
Armagh, Banbridge and Craigavon District Council (Candidates)
Mid and East Antrim District Council (Candidates)
Causeway Coast and Glens District Council (Candidates)
Mid-Ulster District Council (Candidates)
Derry and Strabane District Council (Candidates)
Fermanagh and Omagh District Council (Candidates)

The local government reorganisation and electoral administration was mandated by the Local Government Act (Northern Ireland) 2014. Nominations of election candidates closed on 29 April 2014.

Results
Because these elections were contested with new electoral boundaries, the results are not directly comparable with those of the last election. However, psephologist Nicholas Whyte has calculated a baseline by which to judge the parties' relative performance. This baseline is used in the following tables.

Results by council

Belfast

Results by party

Councils

Antrim and Newtownabbey

Armagh, Banbridge and Craigavon

Belfast

Causeway Coast and Glens

Derry and Strabane

Fermanagh and Omagh

Lisburn and Castlereagh

Mid and East Antrim

Mid Ulster

Newry, Mourne and Down

North Down and Ards

References

 
2014